Galena is an abandoned town in Washoe County, Nevada, south of Reno.  The portion of Reno just south of Mount Rose Highway and west of Steamboat Springs is also known as Galena.

Galena was developed as a mining property in 1860, with the discovery of silver in the eastern foothills of the Sierra Nevada. The town greatly expanded after 1862, when it also became an important lumbering center. By 1863, there were eleven sawmills operating in Galena. The town's streets during the height of commercial activity, were crowded with "grog shops overflowed with charcoal burners, wood choppers, timbermen, millers, miners, bullwhackers and teamsters"

The town was abandoned after 1867, following two disastrous fires. 

In 1990, the University of Nevada, Reno Mackay School of Mines operated a training site for students at the nearby Union Mine.

The site is marked by Nevada Historical Marker number 212.

See also 
 Galena, Lander County, Nevada - a ghost town

References

External links 
 Galena (Washoe County) nvexpeditions

Geography of Nevada
Nevada historical markers
Populated places established in 1860
1860 establishments in Utah Territory